The 2002 New Zealand National Club Championship, also known, due to naming-rights sponsorship, as the Southern Trust National League was the third season of a nationwide club competition in New Zealand football. The competition was won by Miramar Rangers.

The league was played mainly during autumn, with matches played from February to June, and was run in two stages. In the first stage, each team in the ten-team league played every other team home and away. In the second stage, the top four teams entered a knockout competition, with third place playing fourth place in one match and first playing second in the other, with home advantage being decided by final league position. The winners of the first against second match progressed straight through to the final; the losers of that match met the winners of the other match to decide the other finalist.

Promotion and relegation
Ten teams took part in the 2002 league. Eight of these remained from the previous season. Christchurch City withdrew from the competition, replaced by a composite team, Canterbury United, drawing players from all of Christchurch's main clubs. Metro were relegated and withdrew from the promotion play-offs against the winners of a competition between the northern, central, and southern regional competition winners. The play-off games between the three regional champions were played at Newtown Park, Wellington during August and September 2001.

The tenth place in the 2002 league was thus gained by North Shore United.

Waitakere City finished last in 2002, and entered the play-off series with the winners of the northern, central, and southern regional leagues.

League table

Finals

Bracket

Play-offs

Final

Records and statistics
Biggest winning margin
Canterbury United 0, Central United 7
Central United 0, Tauranga City United 7 

Highest aggregate score
Central United 3, Miramar Rangers 5
Napier City Rovers 5, Tauranga City United 3

References

New Zealand National Soccer League seasons
1
New